Micronization is the process of reducing the average diameter of a solid material's particles. Traditional techniques for micronization focus on mechanical means, such as milling and grinding. Modern techniques make use of the properties of supercritical fluids and manipulate the principles of solubility.

The term micronization usually refers to the reduction of average particle diameters to the micrometer range, but can also describe further reduction to the nanometer scale. Common applications include the production of active chemical ingredients, foodstuff ingredients, and pharmaceuticals. These chemicals need to be micronized to increase efficacy.

Traditional techniques
Traditional micronization techniques are based on friction to reduce particle size. Such methods include milling, bashing and grinding. A typical industrial mill is composed of a cylindrical metallic drum that usually contains steel spheres. As the drum rotates the spheres inside collide with the particles of the solid, thus crushing them towards smaller diameters. In the case of grinding, the solid particles are formed when the grinding units of the device rub against each other while particles of the solid are trapped in between.

Methods like crushing and cutting are also used for reducing particle diameter, but produce more rough particles compared to the two previous techniques (and are therefore the early stages of the micronization process). Crushing employs hammer-like tools to break the solid into smaller particles by means of impact. Cutting uses sharp blades to cut the rough solid pieces into smaller ones.

Modern techniques
Modern methods use supercritical fluids in the micronization process. These methods use supercritical fluids to induce a state of supersaturation, which leads to precipitation of individual particles. The most widely applied techniques of this category include the RESS process (Rapid Expansion of Supercritical Solutions), the SAS method (Supercritical Anti-Solvent) and the PGSS method (Particles from Gas Saturated Solutions). These modern techniques allow for greater tuneability of the process. Parameters like relative pressure and temperature, solute concentration, and antisolvent to solvent ratio are varied to adjust the output to the producer's needs. The supercritical fluid methods result in finer control over particle diameters, distribution of particle size and consistency of morphology. Because of the relatively low pressure involved, many supercritical fluid methods can incorporate thermolabile materials. Modern techniques involve renewable, nonflammable and nontoxic chemicals.

RESS 
In the case of RESS (Rapid Expansion of Supercritical Solutions), the supercritical fluid is used to dissolve the solid material under high pressure and temperature, thus forming a homogeneous supercritical phase. Thereafter, the mixture is expanded through a nozzle to form the smaller particles. Immediately upon exiting the nozzle, rapid expansion occurs, lowering the pressure. The pressure will drop below supercritical pressure, causing the supercritical fluid - usually carbon dioxide - to return to the gas state. This phase change severely decreases the solubility of the mixture and results in precipitation of particles. The less time it takes the solution to expand and the solute to precipitate, the narrower the particle size distribution will be. Faster precipitation times also tend to result in smaller particle diameters.

SAS 
In the SAS method (Supercritical Anti-Solvent), the solid material is dissolved in an organic solvent. The supercritical fluid is then added as an antisolvent, which decreases the solubility of the system. As a result, particles of small diameter are formed. There are various submethods to SAS which differ in the method of introduction of the supercritical fluid into the organic solution.

PGSS 
In the PGSS method (Particles from Gas Saturated Solutions) the solid material is melted and the supercritical fluid is dissolved in it. However, in this case the solution is forced to expand through a nozzle, and in this way nanoparticles are formed. The PGSS method has the advantage that because of the supercritical fluid, the melting point of the solid material is reduced. Therefore, the solid melts at a lower temperature than the normal melting temperature at ambient pressure.

Applications
Pharmaceuticals and foodstuff ingredients are the main industries in which micronization is utilized. Particles with reduced diameters have higher dissolution rates, which increases efficacy. Progesterone, for example, can be micronized by making very tiny crystals of the progesterone. Micronized progesterone is manufactured in a laboratory from plants. It is available for use as HRT, infertility treatment, progesterone deficiency treatment, including dysfunctional uterine bleeding in premenopausal women. Compounding pharmacies can supply micronized progesterone in sublingual tablets, oil caps, or transdermal creams. Creatine is among the other drugs that are micronized.

References

External links
 Example of a Micronizing Mill McCrone Micronizing Mill

Materials science
Unit operations